The Men's 1500 metres at the 2011 All-Africa Games took place on 14 and 15 September at the Estádio Nacional do Zimpeto.

Medalists

Records
Prior to the competition, the following records were as follows.

Schedule

Results

Semifinals
Qualification: First 5 in each heat (Q) and the next 1 fastest (q) advance to the Final.

Final

References

External links

1500 meters